William Clarence Cummings (November 11, 1906 – February 8, 1939), nicknamed "Wild Bill," was an American racecar driver who was famous for winning the 1934 Indianapolis 500.

Death
Cummings died driving a passenger automobile on State Road 29 in Indianapolis, when he crashed through a guard rail, overturned several times and plunged  into Lick Creek.  He was pulled from the water by passers-by while still alive, but died at Methodist Hospital two days later.

Awards
Cummings was inducted into the National Sprint Car Hall of Fame as part of the class of 2020/21.

Indianapolis 500 results

References

External links

1906 births
1939 deaths
Racing drivers from Indianapolis
Champ Car champions
Indianapolis 500 drivers
Indianapolis 500 polesitters
Indianapolis 500 winners
AAA Championship Car drivers
Road incident deaths in Indiana